Socorro Díaz Palacios (born 16 February 1949) is a Mexican journalist and politician affiliated with the Party of the Democratic Revolution (formerly to the Institutional Revolutionary Party). As of 2014 she served as Deputy of the LIV and the LIX Legislaturez of the Mexican Congress as a plurinominal representative and as Senator of the LIII Legislature.

References

1949 births
Living people
Politicians from Coquimatlán, Colima
Mexican journalists
Women members of the Senate of the Republic (Mexico)
Members of the Senate of the Republic (Mexico)
Members of the Chamber of Deputies (Mexico)
Presidents of the Chamber of Deputies (Mexico)
Institutional Revolutionary Party politicians
Party of the Democratic Revolution politicians
Women members of the Chamber of Deputies (Mexico)
20th-century Mexican politicians
20th-century Mexican women politicians
21st-century Mexican politicians
21st-century Mexican women politicians